Taloqan Airport  is an airport serving the city of Taloqan (also known as Taluqan) in Takhar Province, Afghanistan.

See also
List of airports in Afghanistan

References

External links 
 Airport record for Taluqan Airport at Landings.com.

Airports in Afghanistan
Buildings and structures in Takhar Province